The 169th New York State Legislature, consisting of the New York State Senate and the New York State Assembly, met from January 7, 1953, to June 10, 1954, during the eleventh and twelfth years of Thomas E. Dewey's governorship, in Albany.

Background
Under the provisions of the New York Constitution of 1938, re-apportioned in 1943, 56 Senators and 150 assemblymen were elected in single-seat districts for two-year terms. The senatorial districts consisted either of one or more entire counties; or a contiguous area within a single county. The counties which were divided into more than one senatorial district were Kings (nine districts), New York (six), Bronx (five), Queens (four), Erie (three), Westchester (three), Monroe (two) and Nassau (two). The Assembly districts consisted either of a single entire county (except Hamilton Co.), or of contiguous area within one county.

At this time there were two major political parties: the Republican Party and the Democratic Party. The Liberal Party, the American Labor Party, the Socialist Workers Party, the Socialist Party and the Socialist Labor Party (running under the name of "Industrial Government Party") also nominated tickets.

Elections
The New York state election, 1952, was held on November 4. The only statewide elective office up for election was carried by the incumbent Republican U.S. Senator Irving M. Ives. The approximate party strength at this election, as expressed by the vote for U.S. Senator, was: Republicans 3,854,000; Democrats 2,522,000; Liberals 490,000; American Labor 105,000; Socialist Workers 4,300; Socialists 3,400; and Industrial Government 2,500.

All five women members of the previous legislature—Assemblywomen Mary A. Gillen (Dem.), of Brooklyn; Janet Hill Gordon (Rep.), a lawyer of Norwich; Genesta M. Strong (Rep.), of Plandome Heights; Mildred F. Taylor (Rep.), a coal dealer of Lyons; and Maude E. Ten Eyck (Rep.), of Manhattan—were re-elected. Ex-Assemblywoman Gladys E. Banks, of the Bronx, was again elected to the Assembly.

The New York state election, 1953, was held on November 3. The only statewide elective office up for election was carried by the incumbent Chief Judge of the Court of Appeals Edmund H. Lewis who had been appointed temporarily to fill the vacancy caused by the death of John T. Loughran. Also, nine amendments to the State Constitution, among them one that required the voter to cast a single joint vote for the candidates for Governor and Lieutenant Governor on any ticket, were approved by the electorate. One vacancy in the State Senate and eight vacancies in the Assembly were filled.

Frances K. Marlatt, a lawyer of Mount Vernon, was elected to fill a vacancy in the Assembly, reaching again the number of seven women in the Assembly.

Sessions
The Legislature met for the first regular session (the 176th) at the State Capitol in Albany on January 7, 1953; and adjourned on March 21.

Oswald D. Heck (Rep.) was re-elected Speaker.

Arthur H. Wicks (Rep.) was re-elected Temporary President of the State Senate. On September 30, 1953, Lt. Gov. Frank C. Moore (Rep.) resigned and on October 1, 1953, Wicks became Acting Lieutenant Governor.

The Legislature met for a special session at the State Capitol in Albany on November 17, 1953; and adjourned on the next day. The session was called to enact a new State Senate re-apportionment. On November 18, 1953, Wicks resigned as Temporary President, and Walter J. Mahoney was elected to succeed as Temporary President and Acting Lieutenant Governor.

The Legislature met for the second regular session (the 177th) at the State Capitol in Albany on January 6, 1954; and adjourned on March 20.

The Legislature met for another special session at the State Capitol in Albany on June 10, 1954; and adjourned on the same day. The session was called to enact legislation concerning the Long Island Rail Road, amendments to the new legislative re-apportionment, and the construction of the Moses-Saunders Power Dam.

The Legislature re-apportioned the Senate districts and the number of seats per county. The total number of senators was increased from 56 to 58; Bronx County lost one senatorial seat; and Nassau, Onondaga and Queens counties gained one senatorial seat each. Kings County lost two Assembly seats, and Albany and Bronx counties lost one seat each; Nassau County gained two seats, and Queens and Suffolk counties gained one seat each.

State Senate

Districts

Senators
The asterisk (*) denotes members of the previous Legislature who continued in office as members of this Legislature. Wheeler Milmoe changed from the Assembly to the Senate at the beginning of this Legislature. Assemblyman Edward P. Larkin was elected to fill a vacancy in the Senate.

Note: For brevity, the chairmanships omit the words "...the Committee on (the)..."

Employees
 Secretary: William S. King

State Assembly

Assemblymen

Note: For brevity, the chairmanships omit the words "...the Committee on (the)..."

Employees
 Clerk: Ansley B. Borkowski
 Sergeant-at-Arms: Herbert A. Bartholomew

Notes

Sources
 These Are Your N.Y. State Senators And Assemblymen, with Addresses in Civil Service Leader (January 27, 1953, Vol. XIV, No. 20, pg. 4f)
 Members of the New York Senate (1950s) at Political Graveyard
 Members of the New York Assembly (1950s) at Political Graveyard

169
1953 in New York (state)
1954 in New York (state)
1953 U.S. legislative sessions
1954 U.S. legislative sessions